A one-hit wonder is a musical artist who is successful with one hit song, but without a comparable subsequent hit. The term may also be applied to an artist who is remembered for only one hit despite other successes (such as "Take on Me" by A-ha in the United States, which topped a Rolling Stone magazine poll to find the top one-hit wonder). This list contains artists known primarily for one hit song in the United States, who are described as one-hit wonders by the media even though they may actually have had multiple hits.

Criteria
Music reviewers and journalists sometimes describe a musical artist as a one-hit wonder, based on their professional assessment of chart success, sales figures, and fame.

For the purpose of his book The Billboard Book of One-Hit Wonders, music journalist Wayne Jancik defines a one-hit wonder as "an act that has won a position on Billboards national, pop, Top 40 just once." In his definition of an "act", Jancik distinguishes between a solo performer and a group performance (thus, for example, Roger Daltrey's "Without Your Love" is counted despite Daltrey's numerous hits as frontman for the Who), and a number of musicians appear multiple times, either with multiple bands or as a member of a band and as a solo artist. (Eponymous bands are generally not separated; thus Charlie Daniels is not counted as a one-hit wonder for "Uneasy Rider" and the hits of the Charlie Daniels Band are credited to him.)

Fred Bronson, a journalist and former writer for Billboard magazine, in his book Billboard's Hottest Hot 100 Hits, uses the criterion that an artist is ineligible to be categorized as a "one-hit wonder" if they have a second song listed on the Billboard Hot 100.

Disc jockey and music writer Brent Mann points out how some artists have been called a "one-hit wonder" despite having other charting singles; in these cases, one signature song so overshadows the rest of the artist's discography that only that song remains familiar to later audiences. As an example, English-born singer Albert Hammond enjoyed success with "It Never Rains in Southern California" (1972) rising to number 5 in the US, but his follow-up single, "I'm a Train" was dismissed by Mann as "totally forgotten" even though it charted at number 31 in 1974. In another case, Scottish rockers Simple Minds followed their big hit "Don't You (Forget About Me)" (appearing in the opening and closing scenes of the film The Breakfast Club) with "Alive and Kicking" which peaked at number 3 in the US, "Sanctify Yourself" which peaked at number 14 in the US, and "All the Things She Said" which peaked at number 28 in the US, yet the band is remembered primarily for the first song.

On the other hand, some artists with long, successful careers have been identified as one-hit wonders by virtue of having reached the Top 40 of the Hot 100 only once. Consequence of Sound editor Matt Melis lists Beck ("Loser") and the Grateful Dead ("Touch of Grey") as "technically" being one-hit wonders despite their large bodies of work. Entertainment Weekly mentions prolific artist Frank Zappa as a one-hit wonder because his only Top 40 hit was "Valley Girl" in 1982.

Chris Molanphy, a pop chart analyst and writer for Slate and The Village Voice, wrote that an artist can only be seen as a "one-hit wonder" if they have never had a second Billboard top 10 hit, if any subsequent top 40 singles were released within six months of their first big hit, and if the artist has not had three or more top 10 or Platinum albums.

Multiple appearances
British musician Tony Burrows sang the lead vocal on five one-hit wonders: Edison Lighthouse's "Love Grows (Where My Rosemary Goes)" (February 1970); White Plains' "My Baby Loves Lovin'" (March 1970); the Pipkins' "Gimme Dat Ding" (April 1970); the First Class' "Beach Baby" (July 1974); and "United We Stand" (1970) by the first incarnation of the Brotherhood of Man.

Joey Levine, American session singer best known for his prolific work in the bubblegum pop and commercial jingle genera, who had recorded hits for the Ohio Express ("Yummy Yummy Yummy"), also sang hits for the Third Rail, the Kasenetz-Katz Singing Orchestral Circus ("Quick Joey Small") and Reunion ("Life Is a Rock (But the Radio Rolled Me)").

British singer Limahl sang lead vocal on two US one-hit wonder songs; the first, "Too Shy" in 1983, came during his tenure as the frontman for the group Kajagoogoo. The next year, he had another hit single as a solo artist with "The NeverEnding Story", the title track to the film The NeverEnding Story. The latter song charted at number 17 in May 1985.

List

Each artist listed here has been identified by at least two publications as being a one-hit wonder in the U.S. Some artists listed here have reached the Top 40 of the Billboard Hot 100 more than once. The year indicates when the song charted or peaked.

1950s

The Crows – "Gee" (1953)
Penguins – "Earth Angel" (1954)
The Chords – "Sh-Boom" (1954)
Lillian Briggs – "I Want You to Be My Baby" (1955)
Gene Vincent & His Blue Caps – "Be-Bop-a-Lula" (1956)
Dale Hawkins – "Susie Q" (1957)
Mickey & Sylvia – "Love Is Strange" (1957)
Buddy Knox – "Party Doll" (1957)
Thurston Harris – "Little Bitty Pretty One" (1957)
The Silhouettes – "Get a Job" (1957)
 The Teddy Bears – "To Know Him is to Love Him" (1958)
Bobby Day – "Rockin' Robin" (1958)
The Monotones – "The Book of Love" (1958)
Laurie London – "He's Got the Whole World in His Hands" (1958)
The Jamies – "Summertime, Summertime" (1958)
The Kalin Twins – "When" (1958)
Link Wray & His Raymen – "Rumble" (1958)
Bobby Freeman – "Do You Want to Dance" (1958)
The Big Bopper – "Chantilly Lace" (1958)
The Poni-Tails – "Born Too Late" (1958)
The Danleers – "One Summer Night" (1958)
Bobby Hendricks – "Itchy Twitchy Feeling" (1958)
 The Champs – "Tequila" (1958)
The Royal Teens – "Short Shorts" (1958)
The Elegants – "Little Star" (1958)
Frankie Ford – "Sea Cruise" (1959)
The Mystics – "Hushabye" (1959)
Larry Hall – "Sandy" (1959)
Jerry Keller – "Here Comes Summer" (1959)
Santo & Johnny – "Sleep Walk" (1959)
Dodie Stevens – "Pink Shoe Laces" (1959)
The Impalas – "Sorry (I Ran All the Way Home)" (1959)
The Skyliners – "Since I Don't Have You" (1959)
Jimmy Driftwood – "The Battle of New Orleans" (1959)
Phil Phillips – "Sea of Love" (1959)

1960s

 Mark Dinning – "Teen Angel" (1960)  
Maurice Williams and the Zodiacs – "Stay" (1960)
Bruce Channel – "Hey! Baby" (1961)
The Contours – "Do You Love Me" (1962)
Bobby Pickett – "Monster Mash" (1962)
Joanie Sommers – "Johnny Get Angry" (1962)
Bent Fabric – "Alley Cat" (1962)
The Cascades – "Rhythm of the Rain" (1962)
The Exciters – "Tell Him" (1962)
Little Peggy March – "I Will Follow Him" (1963) 
Doris Troy – "Just One Look" (1963)
The Chantays – "Pipeline" (1963)
Kyu Sakamoto – "Sukiyaki" (1963)
The Singing Nun – "Dominique" (1963)
The Surfaris – "Wipe Out" (1963)

The Jaynetts – "Sally Go 'Round the Roses" (1963)
The Reflections – "(Just Like) Romeo and Juliet" (1964)
Cilla Black – "You're My World" (1964)
 Jewel Akens – "The Birds and the Bees" (1964)
Terry Stafford – "Suspicion" (1964)
 J. Frank Wilson and the Cavaliers – "Last Kiss" (1964)
The Standells – "Dirty Water" (1965)
Barry McGuire – "Eve of Destruction" (1965)
The Gentrys – "Keep On Dancing" (1965)
The Castaways – "Liar, Liar" (1965)
Staff Sergeant Barry Sadler – "Ballad of the Green Berets" (1966)
Bob Kuban and the In-Men – "The Cheater" (1966)
Blues Magoos – "(We Ain't Got) Nothin' Yet" (1966)
The Knickerbockers – "Lies" (1966)
The Music Machine – "Talk Talk" (1966)
The Capitols – "Cool Jerk" (1966)
Los Bravos – "Black Is Black" (1966)
Bobby Hebb – "Sunny" (1966)
Napoleon XIV – "They're Coming to Take Me Away, Ha-Haaa!" (1966)
Robert Parker – "Barefootin" (1966)
Syndicate of Sound – "Little Girl" (1966)
Deon Jackson – "Love Makes the World Go 'Round" (1966)
? and the Mysterians – "96 Tears" (1966)
New Vaudeville Band – "Winchester Cathedral" (1966)
J.J. Jackson – "But It's Alright" (1966)
The Casinos – "Then You Can Tell Me Goodbye" (1967)
The American Breed – "Bend Me, Shape Me" (1967)
Robert Knight – "Everlasting Love" (1967) 
Buffalo Springfield – "For What It's Worth" (1967)
 The Music Explosion – Little Bit O' Soul (1967)
Every Mother's Son – "Come On Down to My Boat" (1967)
The Brooklyn Bridge – "Worst That Could Happen" (1968)
John Fred – "Judy in Disguise (With Glasses)" (1968)
The Lemon Pipers – "Green Tambourine" (1968)
Iron Butterfly – "In-A-Gadda-Da-Vida" (1968)
Human Beinz – "Nobody But Me" (1968)
Mason Williams – "Classical Gas" (1968)
The Crazy World of Arthur Brown – "Fire" (1968) 
The Clique – "Sugar on Sunday" (1969)
Thunderclap Newman – "Something in the Air" (1969)
Steam – "Na Na Hey Hey Kiss Him Goodbye" (1969)
Eddie Holman – "Hey There Lonely Girl" (1969)
Zager and Evans – "In the Year 2525" (1969)
Roy Clark – "Yesterday When I Was Young" (1969)
Crazy Elephant – "Gimme Gimme Good Lovin'" (1969)
The Youngbloods – "Get Together" (1969)
Spiral Starecase – "More Today Than Yesterday" (1969)

1970s

 Blues Image – "Ride Captain Ride" (1970)
 Shocking Blue – "Venus" (1970)
The Ides of March – "Vehicle" (1970)
Mountain – "Mississippi Queen" (1970)
Frijid Pink – "The House of the Rising Sun" (1970)
Norman Greenbaum – "Spirit in the Sky" (1970)
Alive N Kickin' – "Tighter, Tighter" (1970)
Bobby Bloom – "Montego Bay" (1970)
Five Stairsteps – "O-o-h Child" (1970)
Free – "All Right Now" (1970)
The Jaggerz – "The Rapper" (1970)
Edison Lighthouse – "Love Grows (Where My Rosemary Goes)" (1970)
Brewer & Shipley – "One Toke Over the Line" (1970)
Mungo Jerry – "In the Summertime" (1970)
The Buoys – "Timothy" (1971)
Climax – "Precious and Few" (1971)
Billy Paul – "Me and Mrs. Jones" (1972)
Hurricane Smith – "Oh, Babe, What Would You Say?" (1972)
Timmy Thomas – "Why Can't We Live Together" (1972)
Arlo Guthrie – "City of New Orleans" (1972)
Mouth & MacNeal – "How Do You Do?" (1972)
Clint Holmes – "Playground in My Mind" (1972)
Looking Glass – "Brandy (You're a Fine Girl)" (1972)
King Harvest – "Dancing in the Moonlight" (1972)
T. Rex – "Bang A Gong (Get It On)" (1972)
 Dr. John – "Right Place, Wrong Time" (1972)
 Apollo 100 – "Joy" (1972)
Vicki Lawrence – "The Night the Lights Went Out in Georgia" (1973)
Aliotta Haynes Jeremiah – "Lake Shore Drive" (1973)
Skylark – "Wildflower" (1973)
Lou Reed – "Walk on the Wild Side"/"Perfect Day" (1973)

B. W. Stevenson – "My Maria" (1973)
Stories – "Brother Louie" (1973)
David Essex – "Rock On" (1974)
Terry Jacks – "Seasons in the Sun" (1974)
George McCrae – "Rock Your Baby" (1974)
Reunion – "Life Is a Rock (But the Radio Rolled Me)" (1974)
The First Class – "Beach Baby" (1974)
Carl Douglas – "Kung Fu Fighting" (1974)
Pilot – "Magic" (1974)
Billy Swan – "I Can Help" (1974)
Jigsaw – "Sky High" (1975)
Ace – "How Long" (1975)
Nazareth – "Love Hurts" (1975)
Van McCoy – "The Hustle" (1975)
Pratt & McClain – "Happy Days" (1976)
Keith Carradine – "I'm Easy" (1976)
 Thin Lizzy – "The Boys Are Back In Town" (1976)
Elvin Bishop – "Fooled Around and Fell in Love" (1976)
  Henry Gross – "Shannon" (1976)
 Silver – "Wham Bam" (1976)
 Larry Groce – "Junk Food Junkie" (1976)
 Cyndi Grecco – "Making Our Dreams Come True" (1976)
Rick Dees and His Cast of Idiots – "Disco Duck" (1976)
Wild Cherry – "Play That Funky Music" (1976)
Starland Vocal Band – "Afternoon Delight" (1976)

Cerrone – "Love in C Minor" (1977)
David Soul – "Don't Give Up on Us" (1977)
Ram Jam – "Black Betty" (1977)
Dean Friedman – "Ariel" (1977)
Alan O'Day – "Undercover Angel" (1977)
Debby Boone – "You Light Up My Life" (1977)
Meri Wilson – "Telephone Man" (1977)
Paul Nicholas – "Heaven on the 7th Floor" (1977)
Alicia Bridges – "I Love the Nightlife" (1978)
Walter Egan – "Magnet and Steel" (1978)
Cheryl Lynn – "Got to Be Real" (1978)
Patrick Hernandez – "Born to Be Alive" (1979)
Anita Ward – "Ring My Bell" (1979)
Sugarhill Gang – "Rapper's Delight" (1979)
Amii Stewart – "Knock on Wood" (1979)
Sniff 'n' the Tears – "Driver's Seat" (1979)
Nick Lowe – "Cruel to Be Kind" (1979)
The Knack – "My Sharona" (1979)
 The Buggles – "Video Killed the Radio Star" (1979)
 Tom Johnston – "Savannah Nights" (1979)
 Roger Voudouris – "Get Used to It" (1979)
 Steve Forbert – "Romeo's Tune" (1979)
 Randy VanWarmer – "Just When I Needed You Most" (1979)
 M – "Pop Muzik" (1979)
 The Crusaders – "Street Life" (1979)
 The Boomtown Rats – "I Don't Like Mondays" (1979)
 Gary Numan – "Cars" (1979)
McFadden & Whitehead – "Ain't No Stoppin' Us Now" (1979)

1980s

 Rocky Burnette – "Tired of Toein' the Line" (1980)
 Lipps Inc. – "Funkytown" (1980)
 Utopia – "Set Me Free" (1980)
 S.O.S. Band – "Take Your Time (Do It Right)" (1980)
 Robbie Dupree – "Steal Away" (1980)
 Benny Mardones – "Into the Night" (1980)
 Rodney Crowell – "Ashes by Now" (1980)
 Devo – "Whip It" (1980)
 The Vapors – "Turning Japanese" (1980)
 Terri Gibbs – "Somebody's Knockin'" (1980)
Grover Washington, Jr. – "Just the Two of Us" (1981)
 Tommy Tutone – "867-5309/Jenny" (1981)
 Soft Cell – "Tainted Love" (1981)
 Bertie Higgins – "Key Largo" (1981)
 Quarterflash – "Harden My Heart" (1981)
 Buckner and Garcia – "Pac-Man Fever" (1981)
 Red Rider – "Lunatic Fringe" (1981)
 Lee Ritenour – "Is It You" (1981)
 Tom Tom Club – "Genius of Love" (1981)
 Get Wet – "Just So Lonely" (1981)
 Joey Scarbury – "Theme from The Greatest American Hero (Believe It or Not)" (1981)
 Silver Condor – "You Could Take My Heart Away" (1981)
 Toni Basil – "Mickey" (1981)
 Frankie Smith – "Double Dutch Bus" (1981)
 After the Fire – "Der Kommissar" (1981)
 Dr. Jeckyll & Mr. Hyde – "Genius Rap" (1981)
 Diesel – "Sausalito Summernight" (1981)
 Prism – "Don't Let Him Know" (1982)
 Marshall Crenshaw – "Someday, Someway" (1982)
 Bob and Doug McKenzie – "Take Off" (1982)
 Thomas Dolby – "She Blinded Me with Science" (1982)
 Patrice Rushen – "Forget Me Nots" (1982)
 Dazz Band – "Let It Whip" (1982)
 Modern English – "I Melt with You" (1982)
 Dexys Midnight Runners – "Come On Eileen" (1982)
 Bow Wow Wow – "I Want Candy" (1982)
 Karla Bonoff – "Personally" (1982)
 Haircut One Hundred – "Love Plus One" (1982)
 Men Without Hats – "The Safety Dance" (1982)
 Musical Youth – "Pass The Dutchie" (1982)
 The Monroes – "What Do All The People Know" (1982)
 A Flock of Seagulls – "I Ran (So Far Away)" (1982)
 LeRoux – "Nobody Said It Was Easy" (1982)
 The Waitresses – "I Know What Boys Like" (1982)
 Larry Elgart and His Manhattan Swing Orchestra – "Hooked on Swing" (1982)
 Josie Cotton – "Johnny Are You Queer?" (1982)
 Tane Cain – "Holdin' On" (1982)
 The Weather Girls – "It's Raining Men" (1982)
 Aldo Nova – "Fantasy" (1982)
 Eddy Grant – "Electric Avenue" (1982)
 Wall of Voodoo – "Mexican Radio" (1983)
 Rodney Dangerfield – "Rappin' Rodney" (1983)
 Frank Stallone – "Far From Over" (1983)
Spandau Ballet – "True" (1983)
 Frankie Goes to Hollywood – "Relax" (1983)
 Michael Sembello – "Maniac" (1983)
 Toto Coelo – "I Eat Cannibals" (1983)
 Fiction Factory – "(Feels Like) Heaven" (1983)
 Frida – "I Know There's Something Going On" (1983)
 Re-Flex – "The Politics of Dancing" (1983)
 Martin Briley – "The Salt in My Tears" (1983)
 Peter Schilling – "Major Tom (Coming Home)" (1983)
 Taco – "Puttin' On the Ritz" (1983)
 Shannon – "Let the Music Play" (1983)
 Big Country – "In a Big Country" (1983)
 Kajagoogoo – "Too Shy" (1983)
 Matthew Wilder – "Break My Stride" (1983)
 Nena – "99 Luftballons" (1983)
 Murray Head – "One Night in Bangkok" (1984)
 Jump 'n the Saddle Band – "The Curly Shuffle" (1984)
 John Waite – "Missing You" (1984)
 The Icicle Works – "Birds Fly (Whisper to a Scream)" (1984)
 Scandal – "The Warrior" (1984)
 Romeo Void – "A Girl in Trouble (Is a Temporary Thing)" (1984)
 Nik Kershaw – "Wouldn't It Be Good" (1984)
 Rockwell – "Somebody's Watching Me" (1984)
 A-ha – "Take on Me" (1984) 
 Laid Back – "White Horse" (1984)
 Mike Reno – "Almost Paradise" (1984)
 Animotion – "Obsession" (1984)
 General Public – "Tenderness" (1984)
 Jack Wagner – "All I Need" (1984)
 Dead or Alive – "You Spin Me Round (Like a Record)" (1984)
 Philip Bailey – "Easy Lover" (1984)
 Talk Talk – "It's My Life" (1984)
 Mary Jane Girls – "In My House" (1984)
 Face to Face – "10-9-8" (1984)
Autograph – "Turn Up the Radio" (1984)
 Baltimora – "Tarzan Boy" (1985)
 Robin George – "Heartline" (1985)
 Maria Vidal – "Body Rock" (1985)
 Billy Crystal – "You Look Marvelous" (1985)
 Yello – "Oh Yeah" (1985)
 'Til Tuesday – "Voices Carry" (1985)
 Eddie Murphy – "Party All the Time" (1985)
 Harold Faltermeyer – "Axel F" (1985)
 Force MDs – "Tender Love" (1985)
 Scritti Politti – "Perfect Way" (1985)
 Simple Minds – "Don't You (Forget About Me)" (1985)
 Godley & Creme – "Cry" (1985)
 Paul Hardcastle – "19" (1985)
 The Dream Academy – "Life in a Northern Town" (1985)
 Chicago Bears Shufflin' Crew (1985 Chicago Bears team) – "The Super Bowl Shuffle" (1986)
 Clarence Clemons – "You're a Friend of Mine" (1986)
 Jermaine Stewart – "We Don't Have to Take Our Clothes Off" (1986)
 Boys Don't Cry – "I Wanna Be a Cowboy" (1986)
 Opus – "Live is Life" (1986)
 Swing Out Sister – "Breakout" (1986)
 Nancy Martinez – "For Tonight" (1986)
 The Blow Monkeys – "Digging Your Scene" (1986)
 Gloria Loring – "Friends and Lovers" (1986)
 The Georgia Satellites – "Keep Your Hands to Yourself" (1986)
 Don Johnson – "Heartbeat" (1986)
 Chris de Burgh – "The Lady in Red" (1986)
 The Fabulous Thunderbirds – "Tuff Enuff" (1986)
 Device – "Hanging On a Heart Attack" (1986)
 Robbie Nevil – "C'est La Vie" (1986)
 Timex Social Club – "Rumors" (1986)
 Timbuk 3 – "The Future's So Bright, I Gotta Wear Shades" (1986)
 Stacey Q – "Two of Hearts" (1986)
 Cutting Crew – "(I Just) Died in Your Arms" (1986)
 Pseudo Echo – "Funkytown" (1986)
 Oran "Juice" Jones – "The Rain" (1986)
 Nu Shooz – "I Can't Wait" (1986)
 World Party – "Ship of Fools" (1986)
 Double – "Captain of Her Heart" (1986)
 Honeymoon Suite – "Feel It Again" (1986)
 XTC – "Dear God" (1986)
 The Communards – "Don't Leave Me This Way" (1986)
 Midnight Oil – "Beds Are Burning" (1987)
 Bruce Willis – "Respect Yourself" (1987)
 T'Pau – "Heart and Soul" (1987)
 Pretty Poison – "Catch Me (I'm Falling)" (1987)
 Living in a Box – "Living in a Box" (1987)
 Billy Vera – "At This Moment" (1987) 
 Paul Lekakis – "Boom Boom (Let's Go Back To My Room)" (1987)
 Patrick Swayze – "She's Like the Wind" (1987)
 Company B – "Fascinated" (1987)
 Club Nouveau – "Lean on Me" (1987)
 Bourgeois Tagg – "I Don't Mind At All" (1987)
 When in Rome – "The Promise" (1988)
 Johnny Hates Jazz – "Shattered Dreams" (1988)
 Rob Base & DJ E-Z Rock – "It Takes Two" (1988)
 Edie Brickell & New Bohemians – "What I Am" (1988)
 Will to Power – "Baby, I Love Your Way/Freebird Medley" (1988)
 Bobby McFerrin – "Don't Worry, Be Happy" (1988)
 The La's – "There She Goes" (1988)
 Johnny Kemp – "Just Got Paid" (1988)
 Dan Reed Network – "Ritual" (1988)
 MARRS – "Pump Up The Volume" (1988)
 Information Society – "What's On Your Mind (Pure Energy)" (1988)
 E.U. – "Da' Butt" (1988)
 Jane Wiedlin – "Rush Hour" (1988)
 The Church – "Under the Milky Way" (1988)
 Vixen – "Edge of a Broken Heart" (1988)
 J.J. Fad – "Supersonic" (1988)
 Ziggy Marley and The Melody Makers – "Tomorrow People" (1988)
 Kon Kan – "I Beg Your Pardon (I Never Promised You a Rose Garden)" (1988)
 Boys Club – "I Remember Holding You" (1989)
 Grayson Hugh – "Talk It Over" (1989)
 Neneh Cherry – "Buffalo Stance" (1989)
 Roachford – "Cuddly Toy" (1989)
 Jeff Healey – "Angel Eyes" (1989)
 L.A. Guns – "The Ballad of Jayne" (1989)
 Faster Pussycat – "House of Pain" (1989)
 Love and Rockets – "So Alive" (1989)
 Martika – "Toy Soldiers" (1989)
 Biz Markie – "Just a Friend" (1989)
 Michael Damian – "Rock On" (1989)
 Jimmy Harnen with Synch – "Where Are You Now?" (1989)
 Sheriff – "When I'm with You" (1989)
 Alannah Myles – "Black Velvet" (1989)
 Kix – "Don't Close Your Eyes" (1989)

1990s

 Shawn Mullins – "Lullaby" (1998)
 Mark Morrison – "Return of the Mack" (1996)
Jane Child – "Don't Wanna Fall in Love" (1990)
Sinead O'Connor – "Nothing Compares 2 U" (1990)
 Mellow Man Ace – "Mentirosa" (1990)
 Vanilla Ice – "Ice Ice Baby" (1990)
 Electronic – "Getting Away With It" (1990)
 The Lightning Seeds - "Pure" (1990)
 Candyman – "Knockin' Boots" (1990)
 Deee-Lite – "Groove Is in the Heart" (1990)
 EMF – "Unbelievable" (1990)
 Gerardo – "Rico Suave" (1990)
 DNA – "Tom's Diner" (1990)
 Queensrÿche – "Silent Lucidity" (1991)
 Tom Cochrane – "Life Is a Highway" (1991)
 Right Said Fred – "I'm Too Sexy" (1991)
Sir Mix-A-Lot – "Baby Got Back" (1992)
 House of Pain – "Jump Around" (1992)
 Positive K – "I Got a Man" (1992)
 Charles & Eddie – "Would I Lie To You?" (1992)
 Paperboy – "Ditty" (1992)
 RuPaul – "Supermodel (You Better Work)" (1992)
 Duice – "Dazzey Duks" (1993)
 95 South – "Whoot, There It Is" (1993)
 Tag Team – "Whoomp! (There It Is)" (1993)
 Robin S. – "Show Me Love" (1993)
 Blind Melon – "No Rain" (1993)
 Haddaway – "What Is Love" (1993)
 The Proclaimers – "I'm Gonna Be (500 Miles)" (1993)
 4 Non Blondes – "What's Up?" (1993)
 BoDeans – "Closer to Free" (1993)
 The Breeders – "Cannonball" (1993)
Corona  – "The Rhythm Of The Night" (1993)
 Ahmad – "Back in the Day" (1994)
 Ini Kamoze – "Here Comes the Hotstepper" (1994)
 Rednex – "Cotton Eye Joe" (1994)
 Toadies – "Possum Kingdom" (1994)
 Everything but the Girl – "Missing" (1994)
 Adina Howard – "Freak like Me" (1995)
 Deep Blue Something – "Breakfast at Tiffany's" (1995)
 Skee-Lo – "I Wish" (1995)
 Los Del Rio – "Macarena" (1995)
 The Tony Rich Project – "Nobody Knows" (1995)
 Del Amitri – "Roll to Me" (1995)
 Dionne Farris – "I Know" (1995)
 Joan Osborne – "One of Us" (1995)
 Luniz featuring Michael Marshall - "I Got 5 on It" (1995)
 Nonchalant – "5 O'Clock" (1996)
 Jann Arden – "Insensitive" (1996)
 Dishwalla – "Counting Blue Cars" (1996)
 Ghost Town DJ's – "My Boo" (1996)
 Donna Lewis – "I Love You Always Forever" (1996)
 Spacehog – "In the Meantime" (1996)
 Crucial Conflict – "Hay" (1996)
 Primitive Radio Gods – "Standing Outside a Broken Phone Booth with Money in My Hand" (1996)
 The Cardigans – "Lovefool" (1996)
 The Nixons – "Sister" (1996)
 Duncan Sheik – "Barely Breathing" (1996)
 Oasis – "Wonderwall" (1995)
 OMC – "How Bizarre" (1996)
 White Town – "Your Woman" (1997)
 Freak Nasty – "Da' Dip" (1996)
 The Verve Pipe – "The Freshmen" (1997)
 Sister Hazel – "All for You" (1997)
 Tracey Lee – "The Theme (It's Party Time)" (1997)
 Aqua – "Barbie Girl" (1997)
 Fiona Apple – "Criminal" (1997)
 Meredith Brooks – "Bitch" (1997)
 Camp Lo – "Luchini AKA This Is It" (1997)
 Shawn Colvin – "Sunny Came Home" (1997)
 Hanson – "MMMBop" (1997)
 Lord Tariq and Peter Gunz – "Deja Vu (Uptown Baby)" (1997)
 Chumbawamba – "Tubthumping" (1997)
 Marcy Playground – "Sex and Candy" (1998)
 The Verve – "Bitter Sweet Symphony" (1998)
 Harvey Danger – "Flagpole Sitta" (1998)
 Semisonic – "Closing Time" (1998)
 Five – "When the Lights Go Out" (1998)
 Jennifer Paige – "Crush" (1998)
 Alana Davis – "32 Flavors" (1998)
 Eiffel 65 – "Blue (Da Ba Dee)" (1998)
 Natalie Imbruglia – "Torn" (1998)
 Eagle-Eye Cherry – "Save Tonight" (1999)
 Lil' Troy – "Wanna Be a Baller" (1999)
 Lit – "My Own Worst Enemy" (1999)
 Lou Bega – "Mambo No. 5" (1999)
 New Radicals – "You Get What You Give" (1999)
 B*Witched – "C'est la Vie" (1999)
 Sporty Thievz – "No Pigeons" (1999)
 Tal Bachman – "She's So High" (1999)
 Jordan Knight – "Give It to You" (1999)
 Len – "Steal My Sunshine" (1999)
 Macy Gray – "I Try" (1999)
 Vengaboys – "We Like to Party!" (1999)
 BBMak – "Back Here" (1999)
 The Product G&B – "Maria Maria" (1999)
 Alice Deejay – "Better Off Alone" (1999)

2000s

 Sonique – "It Feels So Good" (2000)
 Hoku – "Another Dumb Blonde" (2000)
 Nine Days – "Absolutely (Story of a Girl)" (2000)
 Lee Ann Womack – "I Hope You Dance" (2000)
 Samantha Mumba – "Gotta Tell You" (2000)
 Wheatus – "Teenage Dirtbag" (2000)
 Baha Men – "Who Let the Dogs Out?" (2000)
 Dream – "He Loves U Not" (2000)
 SR-71 – "Right Now" (2000)
 S Club 7 – "Never Had a Dream Come True" (2000)
 Jessica Andrews – "Who I Am" (2000)
 ATC – "Around the World (La La La La La)" (2001)
 City High – "What Would You Do?" (2001)
 Eden's Crush – "Get Over Yourself" (2001)
 Afroman – "Because I Got High" (2001)
 Blu Cantrell – "Hit 'Em Up Style (Oops!)" (2001)
 Willa Ford – "I Wanna Be Bad" (2001)
 Gary Jules - "Mad World" (2001)
 The Calling – "Wherever You Will Go" (2001)
Vanessa Carlton – "A Thousand Miles" (2002)
 Toya – "I Do!!" (2001)
 Crazy Town – "Butterfly" (2001)
 DJ Sammy – "Heaven" (2001)
 Norah Jones – "Don't Know Why" (2002)
 Truth Hurts – "Addictive" (2002)
 Big Tymers – "Still Fly" (2002)
 Khia – "My Neck, My Back (Lick It)" (2002)
 Tweet – "Oops (Oh My)" (2002)
 Trapt – "Headstrong" (2002)
 t.A.T.u. – "All The Things She Said" (2002)
 Dirty Vegas – "Days Go By" (2002)
 Chad Kroeger ft. Josey Scott – "Hero" (2002)
 Phantom Planet – "California" (2002)
 Las Ketchup - "The Ketchup Song (Aserejé)" (2002)
 Smilez and Southstar – "Tell Me" (2002)
 Bone Crusher – "Never Scared" (2003)
 The Ataris – "The Boys of Summer" (2003)
 Eamon – "Fuck It (I Don't Want You Back)" (2003)
 The Darkness – "I Believe in a Thing Called Love" (2003)
 YoungBloodZ – "Damn!" (2003)
 Nick Cannon – "Gigolo" (2003)
 Stacie Orrico – "(There's Gotta Be) More To Life" (2003)
 Fountains of Wayne – "Stacy's Mom" (2003)
 Lumidee – "Never Leave You (Uh Oooh, Uh Oooh)" (2003)
 Kevin Lyttle – "Turn Me On" (2003)
 Los Lonely Boys – "Heaven" (2004)
 J-Kwon – "Tipsy" (2004)
 Ryan Cabrera – "On the Way Down" (2004)
 Houston – "I Like That" (2004)
 Yellowcard – "Ocean Avenue" (2004)
 Howie Day – "Collide" (2004)
 Hoobastank – "The Reason" (2004)
 Terror Squad – "Lean Back" (2004)
 Mario Winans – "I Don't Wanna Know" (2004)
 Trillville – "Some Cut" (2004)
 The Click Five – "Just the Girl" (2005)
 D4L – "Laffy Taffy" (2005)
 Daniel Powter – "Bad Day" (2005)
 Snow Patrol – "Chasing Cars" (2006)
 Taylor Hicks – "Do I Make You Proud" (2006)
 Paris Hilton – "Stars Are Blind" (2006)
 Brooke Hogan ft. Paul Wall – "About Us" (2006)
 Fort Minor ft. Holly Brook – "Where'd You Go" (2006)
 Jibbs – "Chain Hang Low" (2006)
 DJ Webstar and Young B. – "Chicken Noodle Soup" (2006)
 The Pack – "Vans" (2006)
 Cherish ft. Sean P – "Do It to It" (2006)
 Young Dro – "Shoulder Lean" (2006)
 Augustana – "Boston" (2006)
 Hellogoodbye – "Here (In Your Arms)" (2006)
 Gnarls Barkley – "Crazy" (2006)
 Rich Boy – "Throw Some D's" (2006)

 Mims – "This Is Why I'm Hot" (2007)
 Huey – "Pop, Lock & Drop It" (2007)
 J. Holiday – "Bed" (2007)
 Elliott Yamin – "Wait For You" (2007)
 Hurricane Chris – "A Bay Bay" (2007)
 Yael Naim – "New Soul" (2008)
 Michael Franti & Spearhead – "Say Hey (I Love You)" (2008)
 David Archuleta – "Crush" (2008)
 Flobots – "Handlebars" (2008)
 Metro Station – "Shake It" (2008)
 Estelle – "American Boy" (2008)
 The Veronicas – "Untouched" (2009)
 Asher Roth – "I Love College" (2009)

2010s
 

Yolanda Be Cool featuring DCUP (2010) – "We No Speak Americano"
Orianthi – "According To You" (2010)
Spose – "I'm Awesome" (2010)
La Roux – "Bulletproof" (2010)
Jaron and the Long Road to Love – "Pray for You" (2010)
Duck Sauce – "Barbra Streisand" (2010)
Cali Swag District – "Teach Me How to Dougie" (2010)
Alexandra Stan - "Mr Saxobeat" (2011)

Kreayshawn - "Gucci Gucci" (2011) 
Rebecca Black – "Friday" (2011)
Karmin – "Brokenhearted" (2012)
Grouplove – "Tongue Tied" (2012)
Gotye featuring Kimbra – "Somebody That I Used to Know" (2012)
Alex Clare – "Too Close" (2012)
Trinidad James – "All Gold Everything" (2013)
Of Monsters and Men – "Little Talks" (2013)
Icona Pop ft. Charli XCX – "I Love It" (2013)
Baauer – "Harlem Shake" (2013)
AWOLNATION – "Sail" (2013)

Capital Cities – "Safe and Sound" (2013)
Ylvis – "The Fox (What Does the Fox Say?)" (2013)
A Great Big World – "Say Something" (2013)

Bobby Shmurda – "Hot Nigga" (2014)
Passenger – "Let Her Go" (2014)

American Authors – "Best Day of My Life" (2014)
Nico & Vinz – "Am I Wrong" (2014)
Magic! – "Rude" (2014)
Mr. Probz – "Waves (Robin Schulz Remix)" (2014)
ILoveMakonnen ft. Drake – "Tuesday" (2014)
Lilly Wood and the Prick – "Prayer In C (Robin Schulz Remix)" (2014)
Milky Chance – "Stolen Dance" (2014)
Hozier – "Take Me to Church" (2015)
Mark Ronson ft. Bruno Mars — "Uptown Funk" (2015)
T-Wayne – "Nasty Freestyle" (2015)

Jidenna ft. Roman GianArthur – "Classic Man" (2015)
Walk the Moon – "Shut Up and Dance" (2015)
Rachel Platten – "Fight Song" (2015)
OMI – "Cheerleader (Felix Jaehn remix)" (2015)
Silentó – "Watch Me (Whip/Nae Nae)" (2015)
Rob Stone - "Chill Bill" (2015)
Goldlink - "Crew" (2016)
DRAM - "Broccoli" (2016)
Desiigner – "Panda" (2016)
Jon Bellion – "All Time Low" (2016)
Young M.A – "OOOUUU" (2016)
Luis Fonsi – "Despacito" (2017)
Julia Michaels – "Issues" (2017)
Ayo & Teo – "Rolex" (2017)

Portugal. The Man – "Feel It Still" (2017)
Blueface - "Thotiana" (2018)
Sheck Wes – "Mo Bamba" (2018)
Arizona Zervas – "Roxanne" (2019)

See also
One-hit wonder
Lists of one-hit wonders
List of signature songs

References

Sources

External links
Wayne Jancik's "One-Hit Wonders" website

Lists of American musicians
American music history
US